Shinden Station (新田駅) is the name of two train stations in Japan:

 Shinden Station (Kyoto)
 Shinden Station (Saitama)